The 2015 Nippon Professional Baseball (NPB) Draft was held on October 22, for the 51st time at the Grand Prince Hotel Takanawa to assign amateur baseball players to the NPB. It was arranged with the special cooperation of Taisho Pharmaceutical Co. with official naming rights. The draft was officially called "The Professional Baseball Draft Meeting supported by Lipovitan D".

Summary 
This was the third year in a row that Taisho Pharmaceuticals had been a partner for the NPB draft and as such one of their most prominent products "Lipovitan D" was used in the official name becoming "Professional Baseball Draft meeting supported by Lipovitan D."

Only the first round picks were allowed to be contested with all picks from the second round onward being based on table placing in the 2015 NPB season in a waiver system. Waiver priority was changed from All-Star game results to inter-league results. As the Pacific League teams came out on top with 61 wins, 44 losses and 3 draws against Central League opposition, Pacific League teams were given preference.  From the third round the order was reversed continuing in the same fashion until all picks were exhausted.

For the first time since 1974, the Yomiuri Giants were without a manager present at the draft. In the previous instance, that year's manager Tetsuharu Kawakami was to be replaced by Shigeo Nagashima who was absent due to his participation in the MLB Japan All-Star Series having still been an active player.

88 new players were signed at the draft with a further 28 development player contracts decided on.

Lottery Mistake 

In the competition for the signature of Meiji University's Shun Takayama between Tokyo Yakult Swallows and the Hanshin Tigers there was an error leading to some trouble at the meeting.

At the lottery, both team managers Tomoaki Kanemoto and Mitsuru Manaka both pulled their tickets and it was Manaka who pulled his ticket first mistaking the draft logo for the "winning" stamp, raising his fist in a victory pose. Kanemoto, after seeing the Swallows manager's delight, felt that he had lost and went back to his seat without checking his ticket.

After checking the "winning" ticket, NPB officials realized immediately that there had been a mistake but before other officials could check the Hanshin ticket, an interview with Manaka had already started. In regards to this, NPB secretary general Atsuhi Iihara later apologized "we should have stopped the interview but we couldn't. It was a clumsy piece of work."
After it was confirmed that Hanshin had indeed won the rights to negotiate, Kanemoto laughingly remarked "it was like a home run that had been taken away by video replay."

In the aftermath, Takayama made comment that "it was a meeting where you didn't now what was going to happen, I certainly didn't, but I'm very appreciative to have been selected in the first round of picks."
The mistaken Manaka, commented "please return my celebration." As a result of the systems trouble, the draft was delayed by 10 minutes.

First Round Contested Picks 

 Bolded teams indicate who won the right to negotiate contract following a lottery.
 In the first round, Taiga Hirasawa (Infielder) was selected by the Marines,  Shota Imanaga (Pitcher) by the BayStars, Shinsaburo Tawata (Pitcher) by the Lions,  Akitake Okada (Pitcher) by the Carp, and Toshiki Sakurai (Pitcher) by the Giants without a bid lottery.
 In the second round, Louis Okoye (Outfielder) was selected by the Eagles  without a bid lottery.
 In the thrird round, the last remaining the Fighters, selected Kenta Uehara (Pitcher).
 List of selected players.

Selected Players 

The order of the teams is the order of second round waiver priority.
 Bolded After that, a developmental player who contracted as a registered player under control.
 List of selected players.

Tohoku Rakuten Golden Eagles

Yokohama DeNA BayStars

Orix Buffaloes

Chunichi Dragons

Saitama Seibu Lions

Hiroshima Toyo Carp

Chiba Lotte Marines

Hanshin Tigers

Hokkaido Nippon-Ham Fighters

Yomiuri Giants

Fukuoka SoftBank Hawks

Tokyo Yakult Swallows

References

External links 
 プロ野球ドラフト会議 supported by リポビタンD - NPB.jp Nippon Professional Baseball

Nippon Professional Baseball draft
Draft
Nippon Professional Baseball draft
Nippon Professional Baseball draft
Baseball in Japan
Sport in Tokyo
Events in Tokyo